Cañoncito is an unincorporated community in Santa Fe County, New Mexico, United States. Nuestra Señora de Luz Church and Cemetery, which is listed on the National Register of Historic Places, is located in Cañoncito.

Education
It is within Santa Fe Public Schools.

It is zoned to El Dorado Community School (K-8) in El Dorado. Its high school is Santa Fe High School.

See also

References

External links

Unincorporated communities in Santa Fe County, New Mexico
Unincorporated communities in New Mexico